Rear Admiral Ronald Arthur Hopwood  (7 December 1868 – 28 December 1949) was a British naval officer and poet.  He began his career in 1882 with the Royal Navy as a gunnery officer, completed it in 1919 as a rear admiral, and was acclaimed in 1941 as poet laureate of the Royal Navy by Time. As an author, Admiral Hopwood's first work was his poem The Laws of the Navy, published in 1896 when he was a lieutenant. With its good-natured military advice making it popular within both the Royal and U.S. navies, Time gives it "precedence among Navy men even over Kipling's If and goes on to quote Hopwood's new poem Secret Orders in its entirety. The last lines of Secret Orders, written in appreciation of the Destroyers for Bases Agreement (a predecessor to Lend Lease), harken to the Second World War bond between the two navies.

Early life
Hopwood was born on 7 December 1868 as the third son of Mary Augusta Henrietta née Coventry (1841–1894), the granddaughter of George Coventry, 8th Earl of Coventry, and John Turner Hopwood; he was educated at Cheam School. His older brother was Aubrey Hopwood (1863-1917), the lyricist and novelist.

Military career

Hopwood entered the Royal Navy on board  as a naval cadet in 1882, and became a lieutenant in 1890. After serving in the gunboat  on the Cape and West Africa Station, he joined  in 1891 to specialize in gunnery, and on qualifying in 1893 was appointed to the junior staff in the HM Gunnery School, HMNB Devonport. He was gunnery officer of the cruiser  in the English Channel, and then from 27 March 1900 he was 1st and gunnery lieutenant of the battleship  on her first commission, to the China station. Hopwood returned to the Gunnery School, joining the senior staff.

Promoted to commander on 26 June 1902, he was posted to the cruiser HMS Hawke as she conveyed troops to the Mediterranean from January to March 1903. He advanced to captain in 1907. From 1913 until after the start of the First World War in 1914, Hopwood commanded the cruiser . He was appointed in December 1914, to membership in the Ordnance Committee, becoming its vice-president in 1917. He served as such until January 1919, when he retired on promotion to rear admiral.

Later work

He was made a Companion of the Order of the Bath (CB) on 1 January 1919. From 1919 to 1922 he was general secretary of the Navy League, the charity that supported the Royal Navy and the oldest such organization worldwide. His subsequent advancements to vice-admiral in 1924 and admiral in 1928 were on the retired list.

Late in his military career, Admiral Hopwood wrote Our Fathers, The Old Way, as well as The Secret of the Ships, and The New Navy, "all of which were steeped in the tradition of the Service." Thirty-nine of Hopwood's poems, including Secret Orders, are collected in The Laws of the Navy and Other Poems, an expanded edition published in 1951. In his foreword, Alfred Noyes, acclaimed The Laws... as a book of permanent value to our literature; and there is no other book of sea poetry quite like it. Ships and the ocean-sea are the main burden throughout. The manner is of the author's own generation, and the matter is timeless. Steeped in the history of the British Navy through the centuries, they speak of something which may be called, quite simply, the soul of England, something that has saved her from a thousand perils in the past and is her only safeguard for the future.—Alfred Noyes C.B.E., D.Litt.

Of less renown, Hopwood was an authority on Horatio Nelson's ships.  On 21 October 1925, 120 years after the Battle of Trafalgar, Hopwood appeared before the Royal United Services Institution to lecture on "The Ancestry of Nelson's Ships." In 1921, he wrote an article entitled The Saving Grace that appeared in The Quarterly Review 467.  Hopwood wrote strongly of this opinion:The only criticism of a ship which I have never heard questioned, is that she is a compromise.  That is to say, no ship has ever been endowed with the speed, armament, protection, range of action, etc., which the particular specialist admitted to be in accordance with his ideals. It follows that there are sufficient joints in her harness to offer targets enough to provide for the efforts of the most prolific inventor.—Ronald A. Hopwood

The Laws of the Navy

The 23 July 1896 issue of the British Army and Navy Gazette presented a poem that was destined to become one of the Naval World's literary classics. Hopwood's work, entitled The Laws of the Navy, set forth what might safely be termed the "wisdom of the ages" for all who seek to make their way in large, hierarchical organizations, with special emphasis on the seagoing versions. During the Great War era, Lieutenant Rowland Langmaid, R.N., made a series of drawings to accompany the poem, which was published in the version illustrated here. The writer Eeyore Smith in The Naval Review remarked "that The Laws of the Navy has had a considerable influence upon the careers of many naval officers who have served during the last half century. The commonsense, the mild cynicism ("there be those who have risen thereby"), the jingling metre, accentuated by the illustrations of [Langmaid], have left their marks upon the memories of those who have come across the twin frames which hang upon the bulkheads and walls of ships and naval establishments."

By the mid-1920s, the virtues of The Laws of the Navy crossed from the Royal Navy and penetrated the consciousness of the United States Navy. The poem began to appear in the U.S. Naval Academy's Reef Points, a handbook presented to freshmen (called "Plebes") for their edification and guidance. It has been featured in the annual editions of this publication to the present day, and many a former Plebe can recite its words by heart, having been made to memorize them as an essential part of the educational process.

Starting in the early 1970s, Reef Points provided a brief introduction to The Laws of the Navy, which is quoted here (as printed in the 1998–1999 edition):
As a word of advice, we include 'The Laws of the Navy' by Admiral R.A. Hopwood, R.N.(ret.). These twenty-seven laws contain words of wisdom that few of you will appreciate fully now, words which you may wish you had heeded twenty years from now. Read these laws, then apply them. See how those above you apply these rules--and how they sometimes disregard them--and the consequences. Be alert to learn from others; only through experience will your understanding of others broaden. You will become a richer and fuller person, a better naval officer.

First and last stanzas
The Laws of the Navy
To My Comrades in the Service

Now these are Laws of the Navy,
Unwritten and varied they be;
And he that is wise will observe them,
Going down in his ship to the sea;
...
As the wave rises clear to the hawse pipe,
Washes aft, and is lost in the wake,
So shall ye drop astern all unheeded,
Such time as the law ye forsake.

Mis-attributed stanzas
Two stanzas are often quoted that are not part of Langmaid's art or Hopwood's poetry. They appear at the end, set-off with Hopwood's last stanza as the moral to the poem. 
Take heed in your manner of speaking
That the language ye use may be sound,
In the list of the words of your choosing
"Impossible" may not be found.

Now these are the Laws of the Navy
And many and mighty are they,
But the hull and the deck and keel
And the truck of the law is - OBEY!

While their appendage is an unsourced tribute to Hopwood's appeal, their meter is not quite Hopwood's.

Secret Orders
The title of the 1941 Time article ("World War: Debutantes Celebrated") is unusual for a discussion of the Second World War.  Its inspiration comes from the metaphor in the fifth stanza of "Secret Orders":
That even while Goering was spinning his webs,
Ere Goebbels consigned the flotilla to flames,
As trim and excited as so many debs
The fifty were bound for the Court of St. James,
Displaying the emblems that none can mistake
Their feathers—of steam, and the trains—in their wake.

The fifty are the fifty retired ("mothballed") destroyers transferred from the U.S. Navy to the United Kingdom in exchange for land rights on British possessions (i.e. the destroyers-for-bases agreement).

While the U.S. Navy considered the destroyers obsolescent, British naval officers were publicly "agreeably surprised" at their good condition as they debuted in the Royal Navy. Though the fifty in truth were not much liked by their new crews, Hopwood was moved to poetry by the image of old ships returning to duty:
When orders arrive, irrespective of man,
To waken for service as fast as [they] can!
...
The mothers of pilgrims brought up over there
Are waiting with pride to convey them to Court,
As daughters of Freedom presenting their claim
To champion her cause in the family name!

Personal life
On 26 June 1915, Hopwood married Gladys Wolryche-Whitmore of Thedden Grange, Alton, Hampshire, England. They had two daughters.A keen sailor, his love of his profession was one of the dominating factors of his life, and, as is well known, it found expression in the many memorable poems he wrote about the Navy, of which perhaps The Laws of the Navy, Our Fathers, and The Old Way are the best known. ...After his retirement, and as long as his health allowed he took a keen interest in many naval institutions, among them being the Queen Adelaide Naval Fund, the Royal Humane Society, the Royal Sailors' Daughters' School and Home at Hampstead, and the Chelsea Branch of the R.N.L.I.—Admiral Sir Richard Webb, RN KCMG, CB

Hopwood has two portraits in the National Portrait Gallery, London, by Walter Stoneman.

Published works
 at Internet Archive
The Muse in Arms The Muse in Arms - a collection of war poems, for the most part written in the field of action (1917) (Internet Archive)

Notes

References

Bibliography

Books
 at Internet Archive

Newspapers and magazines

 Also quoted in Naval Review 38 (1): 9–10.

Journals

Web

The Navy List, Corrected to The 20th September, 1885, p. 100. (made midshipman 15 Jan 1884, serving 352)
The Navy List, p. 93. (made lieutenant)

External links

National Portrait Gallery images of Admiral Hopwood, taken 1918
The Hopwood/Langmaid collaboration
The Hopwood/Wyllie collaboration
The Naval Review 38 (1)
The Naval Review 39 (4)
Langmaid, Plate I, Plate II, Plate III, Plate IV

1868 births
1949 deaths
People educated at Cheam School
Royal Navy personnel of World War I
Companions of the Order of the Bath
Writers from London
English male poets